Foundiougne Department is one of the departments of Senegal, located in the Fatick Region.

Economy
Foundiougne is a main hub on the Sine-Saloum river in the Fatick Region of Senegal. It is a popular launch pad for eco-tours to see the abundant mangroves along the river. A ferry (connecting Foundiougne to the main road leading to Fatick) crosses the river at set times throughout the day transporting locals and tourists alike. Services that can be found include a post office, hospital, grocery stores, a pharmacy, restaurants, an internet cafe, and hotels. A high school in town serves Foundiougne and Mbam. There is a market every Tuesday (called a luma) on the edge of town, near the road to Mbam. At the weekly Luma, residents can purchase anything that they might require, ranging from plastic buckets to cooking pots to fabric to sandals to western clothing. It is an important center for residents of nearby villages, who travel to Foundiougne often on horse-drawn chariots.

Administrative divisions

The rural districts (communautés rurales) comprise:
 Arrondissement of Djilor:
 Diossong
 Djilor
 Niassène
 Diagane Barka
 Mbam
 Arrondissement of Niodior:
 Bassoul
 Dionewar
 Djirnda
 Arrondissement de Toubacouta:
 Keur Saloum Diané
 Keur Samba Guèye
 Toubacouta
 Nioro Alassane Tall

Historic sites
Foundiougne and Sokone towns
 Cannons (2) installed along the arm of the sea at Ndakhonga, north of Foundiougne 
 Prefecture building 
 Mosque of El Hadj Amadou Dème at Sokone

Djilor
 Site of Laga Ndong, at Ndorong-Log, fangool of the Sereer pantheon
 Pecc, place of the cult of the Gelwars of Saloum

Niodior
 149 tumuli (Ndiamon-Badat) near Dionewar
 17 tumuli (Apetch) near Dionewar
 Tumuli (Fandanga) near Niodior
 26 tumuli (Ndiouta-Boumak) near Niodior 
 12 tumuli (Ndafafé) at Falia
 168 and 54 tumuli (Tioupane-Boumak and Tioupane-Boundaw) at Falia
 17 tumuli (Sandalé Déralé) near Diogane
 4 tumuli (Mbar Fagnick) near Diogane
 6 tumuli near the Bakhalou 
 77 tumuli of the left bank of the river Djombos

Toubacouta
 125 tumuli (Dioron-Boumak) near Toubacouta, on the west bank of the Bandiala
 12 tumuli (Dioron-Boundaw) 1.5 km south of above
 14 tumuli south-west of above
 63 tumuli on the north bank of the fork of the Bossinka
 30 tumuli (Bandiokouta) on the right bank of an arm of the fork of the Bossinka
 72 tumuli on the right bank of the Oudiérin
 33 tumuli at Soukarta, on farmland near the Bandiala

References

Departments of Senegal
Fatick Region